Chemonics International, Inc. is a private international development firm based in Washington, D.C. It was established in 1975 by Thurston F. (Tony) Teele as a subsidiary of Erly Industries. The employee-owned company offers a variety of services globally and with more than $1.5 billion in USAID contracts in 2019 is the largest for-profit recipient of U.S. government foreign aid.  the company has approximately 5,000 employees in 100 countries.

Overview
Chemonics, established in 1975 as a subsidiary of Erly Industries, is an employee-owned, for-profit corporation based in Washington, D.C. The international development and consulting firm has received some of the U.S. government's largest aid contracts supporting agriculture, conflict and crisis, democracy, economic development, education, energy, governance, health care and supply chain, international trade, microfinance, sustainability, water, welfare reform, and youth programs. It has received some of the U.S. government's largest aid contracts and has been labeled a Beltway Bandit.

According to Devex, the firm offers capacity building, communications, corporate social responsibility, knowledge management, performance management and appraisal, and program design services, and has worked on projects in more than 150 countries throughout Africa, Asia, Europe, Latin America and the Caribbean, and the Middle East. Funders have included the Overseas Private Investment Corporation, United Nations Development Programme, U.S. Agency for International Development (USAID), U.S. Trade and Development Agency, U.K. Department for International Development and World Bank.

As of December 2018, the firm has offices in downtown Washington, D.C. and Crystal City, Arlington, Virginia, and plans to relocate headquarters to a building under construction in Navy Yard. Chemonics employs approximately 1,200 people in Washington, D.C. and Crystal City, as of December 2018. In 2019, Chemonics established an office in London, United Kingdom, to increase its aid work with the UK's Department for International Development and Foreign and Commonwealth Office. As of 2019, there were approximately 5,000 employees in 100 countries. Susanna Mudge chairs the board of directors. Jamey Butcher serves as president and chief executive officer (CEO). The company has said 63 percent of its employees in Washington, D.C., are women, and 39 percent are racial minorities.

History

1970s–2000s
Chemonics was established as a subsidiary of Erly Industries in 1975 by Thurston Teele, with support from Gerald D. Murphy, the parent company's CEO and largest shareholder. According to Murphy, he started Chemonics because "I've always wanted a way to do two things: one, have my own C.I.A., and two, be helpful to people." Teele served as the first president of Chemonics until 2002, when he became chairman of the board of directors.

In 1993, The New York Times said the company received 98 percent of its revenue in the form of agency contracts and increased revenues four-fold over the past decade. Chemonics was awarded a $5 million, three-year contract in 1995 to manage the creation of Ukraine's Agricultural Commodity Exchange. In 1997, the company received funding to continue co-managing a privatization project for non-farm land in Ukraine. Chemonics reportedly earned contracts valued at $97 million in 1997 and $58 million in 1998. The company received US$15 million from the USAID between 1996 and 2003.

In mid-2002, the company was awarded a $2.9 million contract to hire 3,000 locals to repair acequia and roads in Afghanistan's Shomali Plain. In Haiti, during the 2000s, Chemonics worked on agriculture programs, the Famine Early Warning Systems Network, and the "WINNER" project, which promotes the farming of Jatropha curcas to serve as biofuel. In 2008, an audit by USAID's Office of Inspector General (OIG) found that the results of Chemonics' $62 million contract in Afghanistan "fell considerably short" of the intended impact, and buildings constructed by subcontractors had significant construction defects. Chemonics said the audit "provided an incomplete picture".

During the 2000s, Ashraf Rizk was president and CEO prior to Richard Dreiman. Chemonics ranked number 70 in Washington Technology 2009 list of the "top 100" largest government contractors based on revenue for the 2008 fiscal year and had approximately 3,200 employees at the time.

2010s
Chemonics ranked number 51 in Washington Technology "top 100" list in 2010. The following year, Chemonics became 100 percent employee-owned through its employee stock ownership program.

The U.S. Department of Labor charged the company with discrimination against qualified African-American job candidates. As part of the settlement, Chemonics agreed to pay nearly $500,000 in damages to 124 job applicants, hired eight of the candidates, corrected hiring software problems, and implemented a diversity program. The company also agreed to sponsor four or more diversity events organized by nonprofit groups and create a training program for local high school students as part of the Summer Youth Employment Program. Chemonics managed to deny liability as part of the settlement and attributed the pattern of discrimination to a manual application system.

In 2012, Chemonics came under scrutiny by USAID's OIG for their work in Haiti after the 2010 earthquake. Chemonics was the largest single recipient of post-earthquake funds from USAID, receiving over $196 million in contracts, many of which were "no-bid". Audits specifically cited Chemonics lack of a comprehensive monitoring and evaluation plan and that "some of the performance indicators Chemonics developed were not well-defined." Chemonics also spent more than 75 percent of program budgets on material and equipment when an expenditure of only 30 percent was planned. Chemonics responded, saying that reports, assessments, and the final third-party evaluation of USAID's earthquake recovery program revealed that claims of failure in Haiti were exaggerated.

An Inspector General's report also found that local communities were not sufficiently involved with Chemonics' work, and stated "Chemonics used contractors from Port-au-Prince to implement a number of activities in Cap-Haitien and Saint-Marc; these contractors brought their own people to do the jobs instead of hiring locals." When locals were required by USAID, Chemonics' policies "limited the transparency of the selection process and increase the risk of corruption or favoritism by granting decision-making authority to a few individuals." Chemonics responded, stating that more than 90 percent of the staff on USAID's two largest Chemonics-implemented programs were Haitian and that the company had awarded $96.3 million in grants and subcontracts directly to Haitian organizations over a five-year period.

Chemonics received USAID funding in early 2014 to operate the Sindh Reading Programme to improve literacy in Sindh, Pakistan. The company had received $501.7 million from USAID by November 2014. Chemonics worked with USAID to help three coastal cities in Mozambique adapt to climate change. As part of the work, Chemonics and USAID constructed model homes to teach residents about low-cost solutions to protect homes during storms.

Through USAID, Chemonics has supported the White Helmets, a volunteer organization formed during the Syrian Civil War and operating in parts of rebel-controlled Syria and in Turkey. Funding from USAID and the Partnership Initiatives in the Niger Delta allowed Chemonics to operate the Strengthening Advocacy and Civic Engagement governance project in Nigeria from 2014 to 2018. In 2015, USAID awarded Chemonics a $9.5 billion, eight-year IDIQ contract, the agency's largest award to date. The contract funds health supply chain programs to prevent and treat HIV/AIDS, malaria, and tuberculosis. In 2017, Devex reported that only 7 percent of the health commodity shipments delivered through the program arrived "on time and in full". Chemonics acknowledged the challenges, saying it undertook a "foundational change," by restructuring "how the project itself functioned from a management perspective". In Year 4, October 1, 2018 through September 30, 2019, 85 percent of health commodity shipments were delivered on time and in full. During that same period the project procured nearly $544 million and delivered almost $699 million in drugs, diagnostics, and other health commodities.

USAID also awarded a $37 million contract for Chemonics to operate the "Promote" program in Afghanistan, which seeks to help women find employment in the civil society, private, and public sectors; in 2018, the Special Inspector General for Afghanistan Reconstruction criticized USAID for results achieved to date. Expending nearly $90 million in taxpayer funding over three years, the program placed just 55 women in Afghan government jobs.

In 2016, Chemonics launched the Blockchain for Development Solutions Lab, becoming the first U.S. international development company to develop blockchain technology. The lab aims to support financial inclusion and make business processes more efficient. Chemonics was the leading contractor for USAID in 2016. The firm ranked number 44 and number 28 in Washington Technology 2016 and 2017 lists of "Top 100 Contractors". The company ranked number 19 on Washington Technology "top 100" list in 2018 and reportedly earned contracts valued at $1.613 billion. It was awarded a 2018 Industry Innovator award for its Blockchain for Development Solutions Lab. Chemonics partnered with Arizona State University to incorporate minimasters programming into staff training and development.

In 2018, the Council of the District of Columbia approved a $5.2 million property tax break for Chemonics' headquarters relocation, despite opposition by member Elissa Silverman who objected to the company's troubled history of discriminatory hiring. Two years later, construction began.

2020s
In June 2020, Chemonics was added to the defendant's list of a lawsuit that was previously filed in December 2019 against six other companies, including DAI, Louis Berger, among others, for allegedly  paying bribes, or protection money, to the Taliban in a lawsuit brought by families of American victims.  This claim relates to whether Chemonics may have violated the Anti-Terrorism Act which makes it illegal for any individual or entity to provide material support to terrorist groups like the Taliban.

References

External links
 

United States Agency for International Development
International development agencies
Consulting firms of the United States
Economic growth